The Ingula Pumped Storage Scheme (previously named Braamhoek) is a pumped-storage power station in the escarpment of the Little Drakensberg range straddling the border of the KwaZulu-Natal and Free State provinces, South Africa. It is about  North-East of Van Reenen.

Design

The power station uses 4 Francis pump turbines rated at 333 MW each, giving it a total rating of 1332 MW installed capacity.

Construction
Notable contractors included CMC Impregilo Mavundla Joint Venture and Concor on the dams.

The scheme was built at a cost of US$3.5 billion (R25 billion).

Construction began in 2005 and the power station was scheduled to begin operations in late 2015. 
 The first two generators were commissioned March 2016. 
 The third generator was brought into commercial operation in August 2016. 
 The fourth and final one in January 2017.

Detailed breakdown
The pumped-storage hydroelectric plant uses water from the upper reservoir to generate electricity during the peak demand periods of the day. At night, excess power on the grid generated by conventional coal and nuclear plants is used to pump water to the upper reservoir.

The upper Bedford Dam on Bedford stream, a tributary of the Wilge River, was completed in April 2011. It has a  water storage capacity of which  can be used for power generation.
The lower Bramhoek Dam on Bramhoek stream, a tributary of the Klip River, was completed in November 2011. It has a  water storage capacity of which  can be pumped up to the upper reservoir.

Storage capacity
The energy storage capacity is 21,000 MWh or 15.8 generating hours.

See also 

 List of power stations in South Africa
 List of pumped-storage hydroelectric power stations

References

External links 
 Eskom's Ingula Pumped Storage Scheme page
 Ingula SouthAfrica

Pumped-storage hydroelectric power stations in South Africa
Dams in South Africa
Concrete-face rock-fill dams
Roller-compacted concrete dams
Gravity dams
Dams completed in 2011
Underground power stations
Buildings and structures in KwaZulu-Natal
Buildings and structures in the Free State (province)
Economy of the Free State (province)
Economy of KwaZulu-Natal
21st-century architecture in South Africa